The Islamabad United is a franchise cricket team that represents Islamabad in the Pakistan Super League. They were one of the six teams that had competed in the 2020 season. 

The team was captained by Shadab Khan, coached by Misbah-ul-Haq. Luke Ronchi was the team leading run-scorer while Shadab Khan was leading wicket-taker.

The team won three of its ten fixtures and were eliminated for the first time in group stage.

Squad

 Players with international caps are listed in bold.
 Ages are given as of the date of the first match in the tournament, 20 February 2020.

Season summary
Islamabad United started their campaign with a defeat against the defending champions, Quetta Gladiators in the opening game of the tournament. They won their next two matches against Multan Sultans and Lahore Qalanders respectively. In their fourth match, Quetta Gladiators again defeated Islamabad. Their next match against Peshawar Zalmi was washed out due to rain. They lost their next match against Karachi Kings by 5 wickets. Islamabad defeated Lahore Qalanders convincingly in their next match by 71 runs which was the highest winning margin in PSL. It marked their last win in the tournament as they faced defeat in their remaining three matches.

The side finished last in the group and were knocked-out of the tournament.

References

2020 Pakistan Super League
United in 2020
2020